Cajamarca may refer to:

Colombia

Cajamarca, Tolima a town and municipality in Tolima Department

Peru

 Cajamarca, city in Peru
 Cajamarca District, district in the Cajamarca province
 Cajamarca Province, province in the Cajamarca region
 Cajamarca Region, region in Peru

It may also refer to

 Cajamarca Quechua, a language of Peru